Harlem is a Chicago "L" station serving the Blue Line's O'Hare branch in Chicago's Norwood Park neighborhood. It is not to be confused with the other  Blue Line station. Trains run from Harlem every 2–7 minutes during rush hour, and take 30–45 minutes to travel to the Loop. O'Hare-bound trains take 10 minutes to reach the airport from Harlem. The station is located in the median of the Kennedy Expressway.

Similar to the 1970-built stations on the previous Kennedy Extension (Addison to Jefferson Park), Harlem station sits in the median of the Kennedy Expressway (Interstate 90). Where the previous Kennedy stations were all designed by Skidmore, Owings and Merrill (SOM) to be aesthetically similar in appearance, stations on the O'Hare Extension beyond Jefferson Park were designed by four different firms in a variety of architectural styles. The Harlem station, the only one designed by SOM, shares a similar boxy, open design of the previous 1970 Kennedy Extension (and the 1969-built Dan Ryan stations), except the newer Harlem station has an enclosed platform canopy where the support frame was designed on the highway median walls, thus providing an unobstructed platform, free of column supports. An almost identical canopy frame was also employed at the  station, however, it was designed another architectural super-giant, Perkins + Will.

Bus connections
CTA

 88 Higgins
 90 Harlem

Pace

 209 Busse Highway (Weekdays only)
 423 Linden CTA/The Glen/Harlem CTA (Weekdays only)

Gallery

See also
 (CTA Blue Line Congress branch)
 (CTA Green Line)

Notes and references

Notes

References

External links
Harlem (O'Hare Line) Station Page
Harlem Avenue entrance from Google Maps Street View
Bus Terminal Entrance along Bryn Mawr Avenue from Google Maps Street View
Bus Terminal Entrance along Higgins Avenue from Google Maps Street View

CTA Blue Line stations
Railway stations in the United States opened in 1983